The Edward J. DeHart House, also referred to as Lakecliff, is a historic residence located in Hood River, Oregon, United States.

The house was listed on the National Register of Historic Places in 1990.

See also

National Register of Historic Places listings in Hood River County, Oregon

References

External links

1907 establishments in Oregon
A. E. Doyle buildings
Buildings and structures in Hood River, Oregon
Houses completed in 1908
Houses in Hood River County, Oregon
Houses on the National Register of Historic Places in Oregon
National Register of Historic Places in Hood River County, Oregon
Shingle Style architecture in Oregon